Eucalyptus ravida is a species of small mallet that is endemic to Western Australia. It has smooth, shiny bark, lance-shaped adult leaves, flower buds in groups of seven, white flowers and conical to hemispherical fruit.

Description
Eucalyptus ravida is a mallet that has fluted stems and typically grows to a height of  but does not form a lignotuber. It has smooth shiny greyish to brownish bark. Flowering occurs from September to December and the flowers are creamy white.

Taxonomy and naming
Eucalyptus ravida was first formally described in 1991 by Lawrence Alexander Sidney Johnson and Ken Hill in the journal Telopea. The specific epithet (ravida) is from the Latin word ravidus meaning "greyish", referring to the appearance of the tree caused by the glaucous twigs.

Eucalyptus ravida  is one of the six true gimlet species that have buds in groups of seven. The other true gimlets are E. campaspe , E. effusa , E. salubris, E. terebra and E. tortilis. The non-glaucous E. salubris is easily distinguished from E. ravida and E. campaspe both of which have conspicuously glaucous branchlets.

Distribution and habitat
This mallet is found on undulating plains and shallow depressions between Callion, Norseman and Zanthus in the Avon Wheatbelt, Coolgardie, Mallee and Murchison biogeographic regions.

Conservation status
This eucalypt is classified as "not threatened" by the Western Australian Government Department of Parks and Wildlife.

See also
List of Eucalyptus species

References

Eucalypts of Western Australia
ravida
Myrtales of Australia
Plants described in 1991
Taxa named by Lawrence Alexander Sidney Johnson
Taxa named by Ken Hill (botanist)